All-through schools educate young people throughout multiple stages of their education, generally throughout childhood and adolescence.

Definition 
The term "all-through" can be legitimately applied to establishments in many different circumstances, but one commonly accepted definition is "schools which include at least two stages of a young person's education within the one establishment".

In the United Kingdom 
All through-schools combine primary and secondary education  and may provide schooling over as wide an age range as three to nineteen years old.

In 2009, there were only 13 all-through state schools in England, but the Coalition Government's Free school (England) programme has seen the number expand rapidly. State all-through schools also exist in Scotland and Wales. This school type is additionally common in the private sector.

Benefits associated with this school structure include giving younger children access to more specialist tuition in some subjects than they might have received at a separate primary school as well as making the transition from primary to secondary school less dramatic and disruptive. It has also been argued that having pupils attend the same institution throughout their schooling makes it easier to cater to their individual needs.

Academics and activists with involvement in early childhood have criticised All-through schools as belittling the difference between a toddler and a young person entering adulthood as well as being part of a general trend of imposing overly regimented school structures on young children. However, representatives of these schools state that they often provide separate facilities for older and younger children whilst the potential for some adult-monitored interaction between young people at different points of their early lives has also been cited as a positive of the school type.

Examples of this type of school are Simon Balle School, a co-educational secondary school, sixth form, and most recently, primary school with academy status located in Hertford, Hertfordshire, England; and Dartmouth Academy, a non-selective, co-educational school within the English Academy programme, in Dartmouth, Devon, in the south-west of England.

See also 
 Educational stage
 K–12

References 

School terminology
School types